Captain Canada may refer to:

Fictional characters
Captain Canada (comics) a comic book character created by broadcaster Geoff Stirling

Nicknames
Any athlete who is the captain of a Canadian national team.
A member of the Royal Canadian Mounted Police
Ryan Smyth, Canadian hockey player
Dwayne De Rosario footballer, and former captain of Toronto FC
Steve Nash, Canadian basketball player
Michael Saunders, Canadian baseball player
Milos Raonic, Canadian tennis player and 2016 Wimbledon finalist
Brian Tobin, so named for his role in the 1995 Turbot War and 1995 Quebec Referendum

See also
Captain Canuck
Johnny Canuck.